André Masson (born 21 May 1950) is a French economist. His positions include director of research at CNRS and director of studies at School for Advanced Studies in the Social Sciences.

References

French economists
Living people
1950 births
Place of birth missing (living people)
Research directors of the French National Centre for Scientific Research